Venus Nadya Oshun, known professionally as Aja LaBeija, better known mononymously as Aja (born January 4, 1994) is an American rapper, reality television personality and drag queen best known for competing on the ninth season of RuPaul's Drag Race and on the third season of RuPaul's Drag Race All Stars. Aja released her debut EP, In My Feelings, in 2018, followed by her debut studio album, BOX Office, in February 2019. Her second EP, ALL CAPS, was released in June 2019. She released Nail in the Coffin, a Halloween-themed EP, in collaboration with Shilow later that year. She recently starred as a contestant on the third season of Legendary on HBO Max, where she finished in 6th place with the House of LaBeija.

Early life
Aja was born on January 4, 1994, in Bedford–Stuyvesant, Brooklyn. She was raised by adoptive parents. She used to suffer from PTSD and anxiety, attributing her to a "broken family" situation, but stopped having panic attacks after starting drag. She lived as a trans woman for a year at age 18, later coming to identify as genderqueer after learning about non-binary gender identities. Aja identifies as a person of color. In 2018, she stated on Twitter that she is of Moroccan, Egyptian and Libyan descent. Later, in a 2019 Tweet, she stated that she is not of Libyan descent.

Career

Aja began doing drag in Manhattan at age 16, participating in contests at Posh Bar, the Stonewall Inn, Metropolitan Bar and Sugarland. She was announced as one of 14 contestants for the ninth season of RuPaul's Drag Race on February 2, 2017. Aja placed ninth that season and subsequently returned to participate in the third season of RuPaul's Drag Race All Stars. Aja was eliminated during the fifth episode of All Stars 3, but she returned in the following episode to compete for a chance to win re-entry to the competition. Another contestant, Morgan McMichaels, rejoined instead, which placed Aja seventh overall.

The drag house Haus of Aja, based in Bedford–Stuyvesant, includes members Aja, Kandy Muse, Momo Shade, Dahlia Sin, and Janelle No5. They perform at Hardware Bar.

Aja appeared in a commercial for H&M's Pride OUT Loud campaign in May 2018. Since June 2018, Aja has hosted a talk show called Ayo Sis on WOW Presents Plus. In May 2019, Aja was sponsored by Starbucks to promote the company's S'Mores Life contest.

In July 2018, Aja announced that they no longer wish to be known as a drag queen but rather as a queer artist, stating to them. magazine: 

For the next three years, Aja focused primarily on her musical career. In September 2021, she stated that she would again begin performing in drag. After seeing Kylie Sonique Love win the sixth season of RuPaul's Drag Race All Stars, Aja said: "It really hit me at that moment that trans is who I am and drag is what I do,... that me doing drag has never taken away from who I am as a person.... As of today I can feel comfortable to say that I am a drag artist again."

Music 
Aja released the single "Level Ya Pussy Up" with producers WNNR and DJ Accident Report in February 2017. Aja's single with fellow season 9 queens Sasha Velour, Peppermint and Alexis Michelle, titled "C.L.A.T.", was released on April 21, 2017. The track was produced by DJ Mitch Ferrino, who was featured on "Purse First" by Bob the Drag Queen. Producer Adam Joseph remixed Aja's rant about fellow season 9 queen Valentina in a track called "Linda Evangelista". In September 2017, Aja appeared in the music video for Velo's song "Big D*ck Daddy" alongside Phi Phi O'Hara.

On March 1, 2018, Aja released a solo music video, "Finish Her!", which was produced in collaboration with WNNR and DJ Accident Report. It features some of Aja's runway looks from All Stars 3. Her debut EP, In My Feelings, was released on May 11, 2018. Videos for two other songs from In My Feelings, "Brujería" and "I Don't Wanna Brag", were released on May 7, 2018, and July 13, 2018, respectively. Aja's second EP, All Caps, was released on June 28, 2019.

Aja's debut studio album, BOX Office, was released on February 7, 2019. The album consists of fifteen tracks and includes features from Shea Couleé and CupcakKe. A music video for the album's single "Jekyll & Hyde" (featuring Shilow) was released ahead of the album on February 1, 2019. On September 27, 2019, Aja released a Halloween-themed collaborative EP with Shilow titled Nail in the Coffin. It was preceded by the music videos for its singles "Mama Chola" (featuring Amira Wang) on August 30, 2019, and "The Purge" on September 23, 2019.

Personal life
Aja resides in New York City.

Just before filming season 9 of Drag Race, Aja was in a situation of domestic violence with a previous boyfriend. In December 2017, Aja and her current boyfriend were kicked out of a Lyft after kissing. The driver was later fired, and the company issued a statement of support for Aja.

In August 2018, Aja was banned from Twitter for referring to a user who discounted her gender identity as a "senseless cow". Her account was reinstated after a few hours. In a July 2019 interview with them. Magazine, Aja shared that she was going through the process of changing her legal name from her birth name to Aja in order to reflect her gender identity. She said, She further stated, 

In December 2021, Aja came out as a transgender woman, and announced the beginning of her transition, explaining in an Instagram post and GoFundMe campaign, "I have lived my life as Non Binary since 2018 and have recently began to identify more with the feminine aspect of my identity. Now living my life as a trans woman has brought out worries about different things such as my appearance." Aja uses she/her pronouns.

Aja practices Santeria, and she started doing what she called "sex work" on OnlyFans during the 2020 lockdown.

Discography

Studio albums

EPs

Singles

Filmography

Television

Film

Internet series

Music videos

See also
 LGBT culture in New York City
 List of LGBT people from New York City

References

External links

 
 
 

Living people
1994 births
21st-century American rappers
21st-century American singers
American drag queens
American people of Egyptian descent
American people of Moroccan descent
Entertainers from New York City
LGBT people from New York (state)
LGBT rappers
People from Bedford–Stuyvesant, Brooklyn
RuPaul's Drag Race contestants
Rappers from New York City
RuPaul's Drag Race All Stars contestants
People with non-binary gender identities
American LGBT musicians
Transgender drag performers
Transgender women musicians
21st-century women rappers
Transgender musicians
Non-binary drag performers